Zhalan Rashid (also Romanized as Zhālān Rashīd) is a village in Ozgoleh Rural District, Ozgoleh District, Salas-e Babajani County, Kermanshah Province, Iran. At the 2006 census, its population was 98, in 18 families.

References 

Populated places in Salas-e Babajani County